Puerto Rico Highway 863 (PR-863) is a road located in Toa Baja, Puerto Rico.

Route description
It begins at its intersection with PR-2 in Candelaria barrio and ends at its junction with PR-862 on the Toa Baja–Toa Alta–Bayamón municipal tripoint. This highway bring access to several communities and neighborhood developments between Candelaria, Mucarabones and Hato Tejas barrios.

Major intersections

See also

 List of highways numbered 863

References

External links
 

863
Toa Baja, Puerto Rico